'The Queen's Award for Enterprise: International Trade (Export) (2010)' was awarded on 21 April.

Recipients
The ninety-eight following organisations were awarded in 2010

 AMI Exchangers Limited of Hartlepool for charge air coolers and heat exchangers.
 Abbot Group Limited of Aberdeen for onshore and offshore drilling engineering and rig design.
 Aerospace Design & Engineering Consultants Limited of Stevenage, Hertfordshire for design and engineering services to commercial airlines and aircraft leasing companies
 Alcatel-Lucent Submarine Networks Limited of London SE10 for telecommunications systems.
 Allam Marine Ltd of Melton, Hull for industrial and marine generating sets.
 Alperton International Limited of Spennymoor, for engineering goods and services.
 Applied Acoustic Engineering Ltd of Great Yarmouth, Norfolk for underwater acoustic positioning, tracking and survey equipment.
 Applied Language Solutions Ltd of Oldham, Lancashire for international language services including translation and interpreting.
 Ashley Chase Estate Dorchester of Dorset for speciality hand-made English cheeses
 Autonomy Corporation of Cambridge for platform technology with a pure software model offering a full spectrum of mission-critical enterprise applications.
 Baillie Gifford Overseas Limited of Edinburgh for investment management services.
 Balmoral Comtec Ltd of Loirston, Aberdeen for surface and sub-surface buoyancy and elastomer products for the offshore energy sector.
 Baring Asset Management Limited of London EC2 for fund management services.
 The Binding Site Group Ltd of Kings Heath, Birmingham for immunodiagnostic kits.
 Bio Products Laboratory (BPL) of Elstree, Hertfordshire for therapeutic proteins
 The Book Depository Limited of Gloucester an online book retailer.
 Brompton Bicycle Ltd of Brentford, Middlesex for folding bicycles.
 Bupa International of Brighton, East Sussex for private medical insurance.
 CarnaudMetalbox Engineering Limited of Shipley, West Yorkshire for can making machinery.
 Centrax Ltd of Newton Abbot, Devon for gas turbine generator sets.
 Chelton Limited of Marlow, Buckinghamshire for aircraft and ground antennas and related equipment for military and commercial use.
 Alfred Cheyne Engineering Limited of Banff, Aberdeenshire, for winches.
 ContiTech Beattie Ltd of Ashington, Northumberland for flexible hoses, couplings and fluid transfer systems to the oil & gas industry.
 Controlled Therapeutics (Scotland) Ltd of East Kilbride, Lanarkshire for unique polymer delivery system for the precise administration of drugs
 Crittall Windows Ltd of Witham, Essex for steel windows and doors.
 Dart Sensors Ltd of Exeter, Devon for electrochemical sensors for breath alcohol and toxic gases.
 Douglas Equipment Limited of Cheltenham, Gloucestershire for aviation towing tractors & helicopter/aircraft flight deck handlers
 Dynex Semiconductor Ltd of Lincoln for high power semiconductor devices and assemblies.
 TG Eakin Limited of Comber, County Down, Northern Ireland for disposable medical devices used for the treatment of stoma and wound care patients.
 Euravia Engineering & Supply Co Ltd Kelbrook, Lancashire for aero-engine design, overhaul, test and certification services.
 FA Premier League of London W1 for sale of TV rights to foreign broadcasters.
 First Magazine Limited of London SW1 a publisher of periodicals, special reports and text books.
 Future Health Technologies Ltd of Nottingham for its stem cell bank.
 Gilbert Gilkes & Gordon Ltd of Kendal, Cumbria for hydro electric turbines and engine cooling pumps.
 Hallin Marine UK Ltd of Dyce, Aberdeen, for subsea services to the oil and gas industry.
 Imagination Technologies Ltd of Kings Langley, for graphics, video, audio and communication software.
 Industrial Penstocks Ltd of Netherton, Dudley, for fluid control devices.
 The Innis & Gunn Brewing Company Ltd of Edinburgh for range of oak-aged specialty beers.
 Investment Property Databank of London EC1 for provision of portfolio analysis services and financial indices to the investment property industry.
 JDR Cable Systems Ltd of Littleport, Cambridgeshire for subsea umbilicals and power cables for the offshore oil and gas and renewable energy industries.
 KHL Group LLP of Wadhurst, East Sussex publishers & magazine advertising
 Kestrel Liner Agencies Ltd of Basildon, Essex for shipping liner agency and global freight management.
 Kilfrost Limited of Newcastle upon Tyne for de/Anti-icing fluids for the global aviation industry.
 Latens Systems Ltd of Belfast, Northern Ireland for pay for television software development.
 London College of Accountancy of London SE1 for accountancy, business and management education.
 McCalls Special Products Limited of Rotherham, for threaded bar and cable systems.
 McKinney Rogers International Limited of London SW1 for business execution services.
 Metal and Waste Recycling Limited of London N18 Recycling of scrap metal and waste.
 Micro Nav Limited of Bournemouth, Dorset for software and related services for airport and air traffic control simulation.
 Midsteel Flanges and Fittings Limited of Kingswinford, West Midlands for flanges, butt weld, forged fittings and ancillary piping products.
 Moog Components Group Limited of Reading, Berkshire for electrical slip rings and motion control components.
 Moog Insensys Ltd (Wind Energy Division) of Southampton, Hampshire for, measurement and analysis systems for the wind energy market.
 Naim Audio Ltd of Salisbury, Wiltshire for hi-fi audio and audio-video systems.
 Offshore Design Engineering Limited of Kingston upon Thames, for engineering consultancy project management.
 Oil Consultants Ltd of Washington, Tyne and Wear for engineering consulting services to the upstream oil industry.
 Isabella Oliver Limited of London NW5 for designer and online retailer of women's wear and maternity clothes.
 Pace plc of Saltaire, West Yorkshire for set-top boxes & digital home entertainment equipment.
 Parker Hannifin Ltd (Domnick Hunter Industrial) of Gateshead, Tyne and Wear for compressed air filtration & gas separation.
 Pearson PLC of London WC2 for provision of educational material and technology, consumer books and business information.
 Pelam Foods Limited of Chesham, Buckinghamshire for food and drink exports.
 Penlon Limited of Abingdon, Oxfordshire for medical devices.
 Penn Pharmaceutical Services Limited of Tredegar for pharmaceuticals.
 The Penspen Group Limited of Richmond, Surrey for engineering, project management, operations, maintenance and integrity services.
 Pipeline Engineering & Supply Co. Ltd of Richmond, North Yorkshire for pipeline pigging and flow assurance products and services to the oil and gas pipeline industry
 Power Jacks Limited of Fraserburgh, Aberdeenshire for industrial lifting and positioning equipment.
 Powercorp International Limited of London W1 for film and television programmes production.
 Prism Ideas of Nantwich, Cheshire for drug development consultancy services and medical communications
 Proto Labs Ltd of Telford, Shropshire Prototype injection moulded and CNC machined parts.
 RMD Kwikform of Aldridge, West Midlands for hire, sale and engineering design to the construction industry.
 Racal Acoustics Limited of Harrow, Middlesex for military communications ancillaries including military headsets.
 Sandvik Osprey Limited of Neath, Port Talbot for gas atomised metal powders and controlled expansion alloy products.
 Schrader Electronics Ltd of Antrim, County Antrim, Northern Ireland for electronic sensors and for ASIC's for automotive and industrial markets.
 SCIPAC Ltd of Sittingbourne, Kent for reagents for medical diagnostic tests.
 Select Biosciences of Sudbury, Suffolk. Scientific conferences, training courses and consultancy
 SELEX Galileo, Radar and Advanced Targeting unit (UK) of Edinburgh for airborne radar and targeting design, manufacture, supply and support.
 Sentec of Cambridge for smart metering and energy management solutions.
 Sparrows Offshore Group Ltd of Aberdeen for lifting, handling and fluid power technology and services for the offshore energy industry.
 Stannah Stairlifts Limited of Andover, Hampshire for design and manufacture of stair-lifts.
 Strategy & Technology Limited of London EC1 for specialist software for digital interactive television.
 Sunmark Ltd of Greenford, Middlesex for branded and own label food and drink products.
 Syngenta Bioline Production Ltd of Little Clacton, Essex for beneficial insects and mites for pest control in crops.
 Tamper Technologies Ltd of Ashbourne, Derbyshire for security and tamper evident labels and tapes to protect products and packaging.
 Themis Ltd of Trowbridge, Wiltshire for marketing information services to the global pharmaceutical industry.
 United Shield International Limited of Andover, Hampshire for personal ballistic protection.
 Vectric Ltd of Feckenham, Redditch, Worcestershire for software development and solutions for computerized craft industry machines.
 Vero Software Plc of Cheltenham, for CADCAM software for the mould and die industry.
 Walkers Shortbread Limited of Aberlour on Spey for shortbread, oatcakes and other Scottish specialities.
 Ward Shoes Ltd of Chapeltown, Sheffield for returned footwear and clothing.
 Watkiss Automation Limited of Sandy, Bedfordshire for book binding machinery.
 Williams Performance Tenders Ltd of Berinsfield, Oxfordshire for jet-powered ridged inflatable tenders for the marine leisure market.
 Scott Wilson Group plc of London SW1 for design and engineering consultancy services.
 Winn & Coales International Ltd of London SE27 for anti-corrosion and sealing products.
 Wireless Innovation Ltd of Churcham, for satellite and wireless technology services.
 Xennia Technology Limited of Letchworth, for ink-jet products and services.
 Yellow Octopus Limited of Skipton, North Yorkshire for clothing and footwear.

References

Queen's Award for Enterprise: International Trade (Export)
2010 awards in the United Kingdom